Aristeidis Moraitinis  (1891–1918) was an officer of the Hellenic Navy and pioneer of naval aviation. Together with Michael Moutoussis, he performed the first naval air mission in history during the Balkan Wars. Later in World War I, he became Greece's only flying ace, with nine aerial victories.

Early career and the Balkan Wars

Moraitinis was born on 3 February 1891 on the island of Aegina. He entered the Hellenic Naval Academy in 1906 and graduated in 1910, joining the Navy with the rank of ensign. During the First Balkan War (1912–1913), Moraitinis volunteered to join the newly established Hellenic Naval Air Service which was formed at Moudros, Lemnos. On  Army Lieutenant Michael Moutoussis, with Moraitinis as his observer, were ordered to observe the position of the Ottoman fleet in the Dardanelles with their hydroplane, a converted Maurice Farman MF.7. When they reached the Nara naval base they noted down the Turkish ships and installations. Additionally, Moraitinis dropped four bombs, three falling into the sea and one on the ground near a hospital, but without inflicting any serious damage or casualties. This operation is regarded as the first naval-air operation in military history and was widely commented upon in both the Greek and international press.

World War I
In 1914 Moraitinis together with Dimitrios Kamberos took the initiative and established the first naval air force academy. Moreover, the same year, he founded the first aircraft factory in Greece, a forerunner of the modern State Aircraft Factory.

He was awarded British Aviator's Certificate No. 1087 on 26 February 1915; he had qualified the previous 22 September on a Sopwith seaplane at the Royal Hellenic Naval Air Station, Eleusis, Greece.

When Greece joined the Triple Entente in World War I (1917) Moraitinis was transferred to the northern Aegean, where he served under the command of the British Royal Naval Air Service, piloting Sopwith Camels. On one occasion, on 20 January 1918, he fought ten enemy aircraft which attacked two British Sopwith Baby seaplanes he was escorting on their way to bomb the Turkish battlecruiser Yavuz Sultan Selim (the former German ). Moraitinis managed to shoot down three of them. For his service he was awarded with the bar to the Distinguished Service Order by the United Kingdom.

By the end of the war, Moraitinis was credited with a total of nine aerial victories, making him Greece's only ace. He also became commander of the Hellenic Naval Air Service.

Death 
On 22 December 1918, while flying from Thessaloniki to Athens, Moraitinis died after his plane crashed due to harsh weather conditions over Mount Olympus.

Awards
 Greek War Cross
 Distinguished Service Order

In addition, he received a number of citations from Greek and British commanders, and the British offered him a new Airco DH.9 with the inscription "To the Commander A. Moraitinis, D.S.O.".

References

 

1891 births
1918 deaths
Greek military personnel of the Balkan Wars
Greek military personnel of World War I
Royal Naval Air Service personnel of World War I
Hellenic Navy officers
People from Aegina
Greek World War I flying aces
British World War I flying aces
Greek aviators
Recipients of the War Cross (Greece)
Companions of the Distinguished Service Order
Aviators killed in aviation accidents or incidents in Greece
Victims of aviation accidents or incidents in 1918